Sodium glycerophosphate, sold under the brand name Glycophos, is a medication used to supplement phosphate. It is administered via intravenous infusion.

Sodium glycerophosphate is an organic phosphate salt.

It was approved for medical use in Australia in November 2019.

It is an unapproved medication in the United States that was used as a substitute during a drug shortage.

Chemistry 
Ṯhe substance is a mixture of disodium glycerol 1- and 2-phosphates, which have different amounts of water of crystallization; the total amount is H2O per glycerol phosphate molecule. It is a white to off-white powder which may or may not be crystalline, has no discernible odor and tastes salty. Aqueous solutions have a pH of about 9.5.

References

Further reading

External links 
 

Phosphate esters